Sour Diesel is the debut album by underground rapper and Army of the Pharaohs member Doap Nixon. It was officially released 18 July 2008.

Background
Amidst a groundswell of anticipation, Doap unveiled his debut LP, Sour Diesel, which features guest appearances from the core AOTP clique, including powerhouse Vinnie Paz, OuterSpace, King Syze, King Magnetic, Reef The Lost Cauze & more as well as production from some of independent, most renowned and respected hip hop producers such as Apathy, Snowgoons, Stu Bangas, Undefined, Stress, Skammadix amongst others. His song, The Wait Is Over, was also featured on the soundtrack for the video game Midnight Club: Los Angeles.

Track listing

References

2008 debut albums
Babygrande Records albums
Doap Nixon albums